The 2023 Inter Miami CF season will be the fourth season of existence for Inter Miami CF. They will participate in Major League Soccer, the top tier of soccer in the United States.

Background

Review

Offseason

Management

|-
!colspan="2" style="background:#F7B5CD; color:#000000; text-align:left" |Ownership
|-

|-
!colspan="2" style="background:#F7B5CD; color:#000000; text-align:left" |Front Office
|-

|-
!colspan="2" style="background:#F7B5CD; color:#000000; text-align:left" |Coaching Staff
|-

Roster

Transfers

Transfers in

Transfers out

MLS SuperDraft

Non-competitive

Preseason

Competitive

Major League Soccer

Standings

Eastern Conference

Overall table

Results summary

Results by round

Match results

U.S. Open Cup

Leagues Cup

South 3

Statistics

Overall 
{|class="wikitable"
|-
|Games played || 4
|-
|Games won || 2
|-
|Games drawn || 0
 |-
|Games lost || 2
|-
|Points || 6
|-
|Goals scored || 4
|-
|Goals conceded || 3
|-
|Goal difference || +1
|-
|Clean sheets || 2
|-
|Yellow cards || 6
|-
|Red cards || 0
|-
|Worst discipline || Yedlin (2 )
|-
|Best result(s) || 2–0 (CF Montreal, Philadelphia Union)
|-
|Worst result(s) || 0–2 (Toronto FC)
|-
|Most appearances || Callender, Duke, Jean, Kryvtsov, Lassiter, Martínez, Mota, McVey, Negri, Pizarro, Stefanelli (4)
|-
|Top scorer || Borgelin, Jean, Kryvtsov, Taylor (1)
|-

Appearances and goals

Top scorers

Top assists

Disciplinary record

Clean sheets

Awards and honors

References

2023
2023 Major League Soccer season
American soccer clubs 2023 season
2023 in sports in Florida